Héctor Rivas (born 27 September 1968) is a Venezuelan footballer. He played in 19 matches for the Venezuela national football team from 1987 to 1995. He was also part of Venezuela's squad for the 1987 Copa América tournament.

References

External links
 

1968 births
Living people
Venezuelan footballers
Venezuela international footballers
Place of birth missing (living people)
Association football defenders